Carlos Antonio Suárez (born June 6, 1993) is an American born Trinidadian boxer who competed at the 2012 Summer Olympics in London, England in the light flyweight division where he lost a very disputed first-round decision to Ferhat Pehlivan of Turkey. At the age of 16 in 2010 Carlos won gold at the Under-19 National Championships in Cincinnati, Ohio winning 15-7 over Rondarrius Hunter in the final round bout. Suarez earned a bronze medal at the 2012 American Boxing Olympic Qualification Tournament in Rio de Janeiro, Brazil where he defeated Costa Rica's David Jimenez +14-14 and Peru's Enoc Hualinga 11-7 before losing to Puerto Rico's Jantony Ortiz in the semifinal round. He had an impressive amateur career finishing with a 135-15 record including 10 national championships.

Professional boxing record

References 

1993 births
Living people
Light-flyweight boxers
American people of Trinidad and Tobago descent
Trinidad and Tobago male boxers
Boxers at the 2012 Summer Olympics
Olympic boxers of Trinidad and Tobago
Sportspeople from Lima, Ohio
Boxers from Ohio
American male boxers